Jeremy John Bujakowski, also known as Jarema Stanisław Bujakowski (March 30, 1939 – June 1, 2010), was a Polish–Indian alpine skier, and two-time representative of India at the Winter Olympics.

Personal life
He was born in Druskininkai to Polish travellers Halina Korolec-Bujakowski and Stanisław Bujakowski, who in the years 1934 to 1936 travelled by motorcycle from Druskininkai to Shanghai. His father had served as a Warrant Officer of the No.101 Repair and Servicing Unit in the Polish Air Force in the UK during World War II.

After spending his childhood at Poland, he came to India at the age of seven in 1946 with his parents where his father was working with a petroleum company. He studied at the St Joseph's North Point, Darjeeling, and graduated from the St Xavier's College, Kolkata, before leaving for the United States for higher studies, following which he got a scholarship at University of Denver.

Career
Jeremy Bujakowski was India's first and sole athlete at the 1964 Winter Olympics in Innsbruck, Austria. He competed in the Men's downhill event in Alpine Skiing, which he could not finish due to an injury. He returned in 1968 to represent India at the 1968 Winter Olympics in Grenoble, France, in Alpine Skiing, competing again in the downhill, slalom, and giant slalom events.

Alpine skiing

1964 Winter Olympics

Men's Downhill

1968 Winter Olympics

Men's Downhill and Giant Slalom

Men's Slalom

References 

Jeremy Bujakowski carrying the Indian flag at the 1968 games Photo  - image

External links
 

1939 births
2010 deaths
People from Druskininkai
St. Xavier's College, Kolkata alumni
Indian male alpine skiers
Alpine skiers at the 1964 Winter Olympics
Alpine skiers at the 1968 Winter Olympics
Olympic alpine skiers of India
Polish emigrants to India
Indian people of Polish descent
Indian emigrants to the United States
Polish emigrants to the United States
University of Denver alumni